Aberdeen First United Methodist Church is a historic church at S. Lincoln Street and SE 5th Avenue in Aberdeen, South Dakota. The church was built during 1904-05 and dedicated November 7, 1909. It was added to the National Register in 1976.

The building features a "dome on pendentives" with "an open lantern atop the Terneplate-covered roof."

References

Methodist churches in South Dakota
Churches on the National Register of Historic Places in South Dakota
Churches completed in 1905
Buildings and structures in Aberdeen, South Dakota
Churches in Brown County, South Dakota
National Register of Historic Places in Brown County, South Dakota
1905 establishments in South Dakota